Granata sulcifera is a species of small sea snail, a marine gastropod mollusk in the family Chilodontidae.

Description
The size of the shell varies between 17 mm and 23 mm. The rather thin shell has an orbicular shape. The short spire is conoidal. Its color is grayish or pinkish, with narrow reddish-brown irregular longitudinal stripes, often broken into dots on the spirals. The sculpture consists of narrow spiral riblets with interstitial smaller threads. The interstices are finely latticed by raised close longitudinal striae. The spire contains about four whorls with the last 1½ very rapidly widening, descending anteriorly. The large aperture is oblique, oval, lightly sulcate within and
brilliantly iridescent, with red, skyblue and green reflections, neither predominating. The thin columella is arcuate, with a new-moon shaped
flat white or slightly iridescent tract bounding it.

Distribution
This species occurs in the Persian Gulf, in the Indian Ocean off Madagascar, Mozambique and Transkei, South Africa; off Lord Hood's Island, Australia.

References

 Adams, A. 1850. An arrangement of Stomatellidae, including the characters of a new genus Cumingia, with some additional generic characters. Proceedings of the Zoological Society of London 1850(18): 29–40, pl. 8
 Dautzenberg, Ph. (1929). Contribution à l'étude de la faune de Madagascar: Mollusca marina testacea. Faune des colonies françaises, III(fasc. 4). Société d'Editions géographiques, maritimes et coloniales: Paris. 321–636, plates IV-VII pp.
 MacNae, W. & M. Kalk (eds) (1958). A natural history of Inhaca Island, Mozambique. Witwatersrand Univ. Press, Johannesburg. I-iv, 163 pp.
 Barnard, K.H. 1963. Contributions to the knowledge of South African Marine Mollusca. Part IV. Gastropoda: Prosobranchiata: Rhipidoglossa, Docoglossa, Tectibranchiata, Polyplacophora, Solenogastres, Scaphopoda. Annals of the South African Museum 47(2): 201–360, 30 figs
 Kilburn, R. N. 1972. Taxonomic notes on South African marine Mollusca (2), with the description of new species and subspecies of Conus, Nassarius, Vexillum and Demoulia. Annals of the Natal Museum 21(2):391-437, 15 figs
 Kilburn, R.N. & Rippey, E. (1982) Sea Shells of Southern Africa. Macmillan South Africa, Johannesburg, xi + 249 pp. page(s): 42 
 Sharabati, D. 1984. Red Sea Shells. London : KPI Limited 128 pp
 Bosch D.T., Dance S.P., Moolenbeek R.G. & Oliver P.G. (1995) Seashells of eastern Arabia. Dubai: Motivate Publishing. 296 pp.
 Steyn, D.G. & Lussi, M. (1998) Marine Shells of South Africa. An Illustrated Collector’s Guide to Beached Shells. Ekogilde Publishers, Hartebeespoort, South Africa, ii + 264 pp. page(s): 24
 Poppe G.T., Tagaro S.P. & Dekker H. (2006) The Seguenziidae, Chilodontidae, Trochidae, Calliostomatidae and Solariellidae of the Philippine Islands. Visaya Supplement 2: 1–228. page(s): 33
 Herbert D.G. (2012) A revision of the Chilodontidae (Gastropoda: Vetigastropoda: Seguenzioidea) of southern Africa and the south-western Indian Ocean. African Invertebrates, 53(2): 381–502

External links
 

sulcifera
Gastropods described in 1822